Judith Vanistendael (born August 21, 1974, Leuven) is a Dutch-speaking Belgian comics author, illustrator, and teacher in comic art. She also worked for a time as a children's book illustrator

Early life and education
Judith Irene Vanistendael is the daughter of the Flemish poet-journalist Geert van Istendael. After her secondary studies, she attended an art school in Ghent, and spent a year at the Academy of Fine Arts in Berlin. Returning to Ghent, she resumed artistic studies for four years before continuing her studies in Seville, Spain.
She learned comics at the Institut des arts graphiques Sint-Lukas Bruxelles in 2000, with teachers,  and  before publishing in journals such as Ink, Demo, Zone 53001, and Bruxxxel Noord.

Career
Her career began with the illustration of Flemish tales written by her father, Vlaamse Sprookjes (1995), then Het Koeienboek by Bibi Dumon Tak (2000). She also worked for a time as a children's book illustrator.

She wrote and drew La Jeune fille et le nègre, an autobiographical story in two volumes about the love between a young Togolese and a young Belgian. The narration depicts "the absurdity of the regularization procedures for undocumented migrants in Belgium", which multiply the obstacles facing this political refugee. The storyline echoes a novel by Geert van Istendael, Bericht uit de burcht (News from the citadel), which expresses his dismay at his daughter's relationship with an undocumented man.

In 2012, she published Toen David zijn stem verloor (David, women and death), whose hero is suffering from cancer and undertakes to change his life, without succeeding in protecting the women who are close to him from the effects of his agony:—"The disease is the tragedy of the patient, but also of those around him." The work, which is inspired by the death of Vanistendael's father-in-law, took two years to complete.
Her preference was using watercolor. The work was one of the five finalists for the critics' grand prize. She has been nominated for the Eisner Award on three occasions.

Based on a screenplay by Mark Bellido, Vanistendael drew and colored Salto - L'Histoire du marchand de bonbons qui disparut sous la pluie  (Salto - The Story of the Candy Merchant Who Disappeared in the Rain) (2016), which features a candy seller turned bodyguard in Spain of the 1990s. The main character, Miquel, is a failed writer who sells candy to support his family and agrees to become a bodyguard for a politician threatened by ETA, which ends up destroying his life. Vanistendael uses several processes and formats, in particular the colored pencil.

The story tells of the great friendship between two children from Brussels. The series was translated into many languages and received several awards. Director  was inspired by it to create the film Rosie et Moussa, released in theaters in October 2018.

In 2019, inspired by the character of Penelope in the Odyssey, Vanistendael delivers Les Deux Vies de Pénélope, where a doctor mother engages in humanitarian work and distances herself from her family, especially her daughter. Vanistendael opted for a treatment with "watercolor stains". Vanistendael long wanted to describe the life of a woman who, due to an intense job, cannot invest herself with her daughter. Having read the work of Homer, Vanistendael was struck by the role of Penelope, who limits herself to keeping the hearth, while her husband has increasing adventures. Nevertheless, Vanistendael retains that Odysseus left his family because a higher interest required it. In Vanistendael's album, Penelope's husband is responsible for watching over the home, while Penelope, haunted by her missions in countries at war, "refuses to let herself be reduced to her dimension as a mother" and returns to her humanitarian activities. During the production of the work, Vanistendael went to a refugee camp and drew a graphic report: Moria, the hell of Lesbos. For this work, she received the "Bulles d'Humanité" prize, awarded by the newspaper, L'Humanité.

Personal life
Vanistendael has a daughter.

Selected works 
 La Jeune fille et le nègre (scriptwriter and designer), éd. Actes Sud - L'An 2
 Papa et Sophie, April 2008 
 Babette et Sophie, September 2009 
 David les femmes et la mort (scriptwriter, designer, and colorist), trans. Hélène Robbe, Le Lombard, January 2012 
 Salto - L'histoire du marchand de bonbons qui disparut sous la pluie (designer and colorist), scriptwriter by Mark Bellido, Le Lombard, June 2016 
 Rosie et Moussa, Bayard Jeunesse
 La rencontre, January 2018
 Une lettre de Papa, May 2018
 Les Deux Vies de Pénélope (scriptwriter), Le Lombard, September 2019 . Finalist, Prix de la critique, 2020

Awards and honours
 2021, Prix Atomium, winner Prix Willy-Vandersteen with Zidrou, for La Baleine-bibliothèque (Le Lombard)
 2015, nominated, Deutscher Jugendliteraturpreis
 2014, nominated, Eisner Award for Best Painter/Digital Artist
 2014, nominated, Eisner Award for Best U.S. Edition of International Material
 2013, nominated, Outstanding Graphic Novel, Ignatz Awards
 2007, Best comic (Dutch language), Prix Saint-Michel: De Maagd en de Neger, papa en Sofie, Uitgeverij De Harmonie - Oog & Blik

References

Bibliography
 "Judith Vanistendael", Le Soir,‎ 29 January 2013.
 "Le crabe peut nous faire aimer la vie", Le Soir,‎ 20 January 2012.
 "Repéré pour vous. Être humanitaire et maman", 24 heures,‎ 11 September 2019.
 "Un choix que les autres n'acceptent pas", Metro,‎ 4 September 2019.
 Beauvallet, Laurent, "Faire face au cancer", Ouest-France,‎ 5 August 2012.
 Bessec, Alain, "Judith Vanistendael : La jeune fille et le nègre", Ouest-France,‎ 8 June 2008.
 Blehache, Philippe, "Un jeu avec la mort", Sud Ouest,‎ 19 June 2016.
 Boussin, O. "David les femmes et la mort", BD Gest' , 1 June 2012.
 Brunner, Vincent "BD : 'Les Deux Vies de Pénélope', mère et médecin humanitaire", Les Inrockuptibles,‎ 13 September 2019.
 Couvreur, Daniel "La jeune fille et le nègre 2, Babette et Sophie", Le Soir,‎ 25 September 2009.
 Couvreur, Daniel & Vanistendael, Judith (interview), "L’Odyssée, terriblement humaine", Le Soir,‎ 14 September 2019.
 Dauphinais-Pelletier, Camille, "David, les femmes et la mort", La Nouvelle (Sherbrooke),‎ 4 February 2015.
 Jarno, Stéphane, "Les Deux Vies de Pénélope, Judith Vanistendael", Télérama,‎ 5 October 2019.
 Le Saux, Laurence, "BD : Judith Vanistendael tisse la toile d'une Pénélope moderne et aventureuse", Télérama,‎ 10 September 2019.
 Le Saux, Laurence, "Salto" de Judith Vanistendael ou la double face d'un vendeur de bonbons", Télérama,‎ 26 June 2016.
 Milette, J. "Salto", BD Gest' , 15 September 2016.
 O.V.V., "Les Deux Vies de Pénélope", Le Vif,‎ 12 September 2019.
 P.V., "À bras-le-corps", Aujourd'hui en France,‎ 30 June 2016.
 S.T., "Les deux vies de Pénélope", Moustique,‎ 18 September 2019.
 Salin, S. "Les deux vies de Pénélope", BD Gest' , 5 September 2019.
 Servin, Lucie, "Les Deux Vies de Pénélope : Ulysse au foyer", Les Cahiers de la bande dessinée, no. 9,‎ October–December 2019, p. 163.
 Van Vaerenbergh, Olivier "Derrière Pénélope: le journal de création de Judith Vanistendael", Le Vif,‎ 17 September 2019.
 Van Vaerenbergh, Olivier, "Derrière Pénélope", Le Vif,‎ 12 September 2019.

1974 births
Living people
Belgian comics writers
Belgian illustrators
21st-century Belgian educators
People from Leuven